The Peter Nicol Russell Memorial Medal is awarded by Engineers Australia. It has been awarded since 1923 when its first recipient was Prof William Henry Warren. It is given annually to an Honorary Fellow of Engineers Australia who has significantly advanced engineering in Australia.  The award consists of a framed certificate and medal.

Recipients

See also 
List of engineering awards

References 

Awards established in 1923
Engineering awards
Australian science and technology awards